Upper/Lower Koronigl Rural LLG is a local-level government (LLG) of Chimbu Province, Papua New Guinea.

Wards
01. Dage Mitna 1
02. Dage Mitna 2
03. Dage Mitna 3
04. Dageyogombo 1
05. Dageyogombo 2
06. Kamaneku (Supma-Akaduku-Kalaku Siure)
07. Siku (Goglme)
08. Kameneku 2 (Kendkane-Darabuno)
09. Pagau 1 (Benganduku-Dawage)
10. Pagau 2 (Benganduku-Bunamugl)
11. Pagau/Sibaigu (Kondan)
12. Pagau 3 (Komkane-Nombuna)
13. Pagau 4 (Komkane-Angagoi)
14. Giraiku 1 (Akbanige)
15. Giraiku 2 (Wirebris)
16. Bindiku (Kawa)
17. Bindiku
18. Damba
19. Nimaikane (Goglmugl)
20. Dageyogombo 3
21. Dageminta 4
22. Kamaneku/Siambula (Gagugl)

References

Local-level governments of Chimbu Province